Home on Native Land is the seventh studio album by The Hidden Cameras.

The album is an inquisitive ode to lead singer Joel Gibb's homeland as well as marking a figurative and literal return. The record was recorded over 10 years with guest appearances by Rufus Wainwright, Feist, Ron Sexsmith, Neil Tennant, Bahamas and Mary Margaret O'Hara including original compositions as well as covers of "Dark End Of The Street" and "Don't Make Promises" by Tim Hardin and Canadian classic "Log Driver's Waltz"

The lead single "Day I Left Home" was released on August 31, 2016. The video for the single was directed by Canadian artist Geoffrey Farmer. The second single "Twilight Of The Season" was released on October 31, 2016 with a video directed by Canadian film director Sean Michael Turrell. A third video was released for "Had A Feeling 'Bout You" on November 16, 2016 directed by Joel Gibb. A  fourth video was released for "Dark End of the Street" on December 2, 2016, directed by Canadian artist and filmmaker G. B. Jones.

The album was released on Outside Music on October 28, 2016.

Track listing

References 

2016 albums
The Hidden Cameras albums
Outside Music albums